Wollea is a genus of filamentous, heterocystous cyanobacteria that form macroscopic colonies in freshwater habitats. The genus produces akinetes and is known to reproduce with hormogonia.

The type species for the genus is Wollea saccata (Wolle) Bornet & Flahault, 1886.

References

External links
 

Nostocaceae
Cyanobacteria genera
Taxa named by Jean-Baptiste Édouard Bornet